Aouste is a commune in the Ardennes department in the Grand Est region of northern France.

The inhabitants of the commune are known as Aoustiens or Aoustiennes

Geography
Aouste is located some 35 km south-east of Hirson and 40 km west by north-west of Charleville-Mézières. Access is by the D36 road from La Férée in the south passing through the village then continuing east to Prez. The D27 road also comes from Rumigny in the west passing through the commune south of the village and continuing to Marlemont in the south-east. A railway from Hirson to Charleville-Mezieres passes through the commune with a station at Liart just outside the commune to the south-east. Apart from the village the commune is mostly farmland with a few patches of forest.

The Aube river passes through the commune from the east and flows through the village before continuing west to join the Ton at Hannappes. The Ruisseau de Laval d'Estrebay flows from the north forming part of the northern border to join the Aube on the western border. There is also the Ruisseau du Moulin Veron which flows from the south joining the Aube near the village. The Ruisseau de Gandlu flows from the south-east joining the Aube in the village.

Neighbouring communes and villages

Heraldry

Administration

List of Successive Mayors

Demography
In 2017 the commune had 207 inhabitants.

Sites and monuments
.

The fortified Church of Saint-Rémi (15th century) is registered as an historical monument.

Aouste Picture Gallery

See also
Communes of the Ardennes department

External links
Aouste on the National Geographic Institute website 
Aouste on Géoportail, National Geographic Institute (IGN) website 
Aoufte on the 1750 Cassini Map

References

Communes of Ardennes (department)